The list of ship launches in 1979 includes a chronological list of all ships launched in 1979.


References

1979
Ship launches